Aubrey Ayala, simply known as Aubrey, is a vocal artist from Philadelphia.  She has two entries on the U.S. Hot Dance Club Play chart.  In 2001 she hit number one with "Stand Still".  Her second hit came in 2003, when "Willing & Able" climbed to number 24.

External links
 http://www.aubreymusic.com/

References
 "Joel Whitburn's, Hot Dance/Disco: 1974–2003", 2004 (Record Research): pg. 25

African-American women singer-songwriters
American soul singers
American dance musicians
American house musicians
Living people
Year of birth missing (living people)
American women in electronic music
21st-century African-American people
21st-century African-American women